Manegaon may refer to:

Manegaon, Madhya Pradesh, a town is Jabalpur district, India
Manegaon, Maharashtra, a village in Buldhana district, India